Sijiao may refer to:

Dead End (1969 film), Hong Kong film
Sijiao Island, in Zhoushan, Zhejiang, China